Estas são as armas, These are the Guns, is a Mozambican 1978 documentary film.

Synopsis 
Shot by a group of students from the National Cinema Institute (INC) and supervised by Murilo Salles and Luís Bernardo Honwana, the documentary These are the Guns shows images of the Rhodesian troops invading the People's Republic of Mozambique. In 1977, a film crew starts out from Maputo and heads towards the province of Tete to film the damages caused by the air raids in rural areas.

References 

1978 films
Mozambican documentary films
1978 documentary films
Documentary films about war
Mozambican Civil War